Smith–Martin/Apache Boulevard is a station on the Metro light rail line in Tempe, Arizona, United States. The station is located on Apache Boulevard, between Smith Road and Martin Lane.

Notable places nearby
 Tempe Post Office

Ridership

References

External links
 Valley Metro map

Valley Metro Rail stations
Railway stations in the United States opened in 2008
2008 establishments in Arizona
Buildings and structures in Tempe, Arizona